Nemotek Technologie is a high-tech manufacturing company established in May 2008, and is based in the Rabat Technopolis Park in Morocco.

Nemotek Technologie, funded by Caisse de dépôt et de gestion (CDG), manufactures customized wafer-level cameras for portable applications. It provides customized design and manufacturing services of wafer-level packaging, wafer-level optics and wafer-level cameras.

History 
In July 2009, Nemotek Technologie announced a new WLP technology, which provides a true chip-scale package with a minimum thickness of only 400om. The die size is ultra-small at just 0.6mm, which fits up to 40,000 dies per wafer. This solution is based on advanced WLP technology and delivered based on Through Silicon Via (TSV) technology. It provides customers a thin, reliable, and more sophisticated imaging components for applications such as mobile camera phones, mobile computers, and other mobile devices used in medical or automotive. In October 2009, Nemotek announced the availability of its miniaturized Wafer-Level Camera (WLC) for portable applications.

The company announced the development of a two-element VGA lens which was exhibited at the 2010 Mobile World Congress in Barcelona, Spain. A two-element lens is made when two optical wafers are processed and then bonded together.

Most recently, Nemotek announced a one-element wider field of view lens for portable applications. The lens provides a field of view up to 65 degrees while traditional lenses tend to be limited to 60 degrees. The announcement is already making waves in the mobile camera market. The new lens narrows the gap with standalone digital cameras a bit more. The development is considered a milestone for Nemotek.

References

See also
 Science and technology in Morocco

Equipment semiconductor companies
Manufacturing companies of Morocco
Moroccan brands